Bande à Part is the second studio album by the French band Nouvelle Vague. It was released on 14 June 2006 in Europe on Peacefrog Records. Like the band's eponymous first album, Bande à Part is a collection of bossa nova cover versions of 1980s new wave tracks.

The European edition has 14 standard tracks, with an 18-track limited edition. The slightly different United States edition, on the Luaka Bop label, has 14 standard tracks, with a 17-track limited edition.

Release
Bande à Part was a commercial success, charting in several European countries. The album peaked at number 23 on the French album charts, number 15 on the German charts, and number 8 on the Portuguese charts. It also reached number 79 in the UK Albums Chart. The album was awarded a gold certification from the Independent Music Companies Association, indicating sales of at least 100,000 copies throughout Europe.

The music video for "Dance with Me" references the famous dance sequence from Jean-Luc Godard's film Bande à part (1964).

Critical reception

The reviews for the band's self-titled first album, released in 2004, had been generally positive. In contrast, Bande à Part received more mixed reviews. AllMusic drew an explicit comparison between the two albums, writing, "It was something of a small miracle that the first Nouvelle Vague album managed to avoid the seemingly inherent kitsch of covering new wave classics as slinky bossa nova. Unfortunately, the group doesn't quite pull it off the second time around." Spin gave the record a 1 out of 5 rating, dismissing it as consisting mostly of "breathy trip-hop cabaret kitsch, often sung in an infantilized ingenue voice."

MusicOMH suggested that "ultimately Nouvelle Vague’s downfall is not ability or material, but concept. What exactly is the point of it all? Yes, it’s pleasant, but by the end we want to hear some original material from what is obviously a superbly talented collection of musicians. We don’t get it – and are instead left with a compilation of sophisticated karaoke numbers for lounge fanatics." The reviewer pointed out that one of the vocalists who had featured on the first album, Camille, had gone on to have  successful solo career: "Camille, meanwhile, is showing the world that we shouldn’t discount solo careers for Nouvelle Vague’s individual parts."

Pitchfork suggested that the album's strongest material is its covers of lesser-known songs: "hopefully casual listeners will stick around for the closing triptych of lesser-known pleasures: a string-swept lullaby take on Heaven 17's "Let Me Go"; a funereal, accordion-abetted march through Visage's "Fade to Grey"; and the dreamily seductive closer "Waves", a recasting of a song by Brit new-wave curios Blancmange that sounds like the secrets Hope Sandoval keeps when she's talking in her sleep." PopMatters agrees: "What sets Nouvelle Vague apart from your average cover-band-with-a-twist is that only about half the songs on this record are well known." The reviewer gives a mixed appraisal of the covers of the more well-known songs: " "Ever Fallen In Love?" is the only well-known song on Bande a Part that transitions ... seamlessly to Bossa Nova. While "Dancing with Myself" is always fun, it clearly doesn't work too well, and "Heart of Glass" and "Pride (In the Name of Love)" fall flat."

Track listing

European release

United States release

Personnel 
Nouvelle Vague
Marc Collin – keyboards, programming, Rhodes piano, vibraphone, arrangement, mixing, production
Olivier Libaux – bass, guitar, keyboards, ukulele, arrangement, mixing, production

Vocalists
 Mélanie Pain – vocals ("The Killing Moon", "Ever Fallen in Love", "Dance with Me", "Blue Monday", "Sweet and Tender Hooligan", "Confusion"), backing vocals ("Heart of Glass")
 Gerald Toto – vocals ("Don't Go", "Heart of Glass", "Israel", "Moody")
 Phoebe Killdeer – vocals ("Dancing with Myself", "Human Fly", "Bela Lugosi's Dead", "Escape Myself", "Shack Up")
 Marina – vocals ("O Pamela", "Fade to Grey", "Waves", "Eisbaer")
 Silja – vocals ("Let Me Go")
 Birdpaula aka Paula Moore – vocals ("Pride (In the Name of Love)")
 Eve – backing vocals ("Don't Go")

Additional personnel
 Avril – arrangement, mixing, production ("Don't Go")
 Thibaut Barbillon – bass, guitar
 Gordon Brislawn – mixing, production ("Sweet and Tender Hooligan")
 Fred Loiseau – guitar
 Christophe Mink – double bass
 Thomas Ostrowiecki – percussion
 Benoit Rault – flute
 David Venitucci – accordion
 Etienne Wersinger – clavinet

Charts

References

External links 
 
 

2006 albums
Nouvelle Vague (band) albums
Luaka Bop albums
Covers albums
Peacefrog Records albums